The Longmire Campground Comfort Stations were built in the early and mid-1930s in Mount Rainier National Park to provide public toilet facilities to automobile tourists camping in the park at Longmire.  Essentially the same in design, the facilities were designed by the National Park Service Branch of Plans and Designs. Their construction was supervised by park landscape architect Ernest A. Davidson. The timber frame buildings followed the tenets of the prevailing National Park Service Rustic style.

The comfort stations form a part of the Longmire Historic District, which is itself within the Mount Rainier National Park National Historic Landmark District, comprising the entire park. They are each individually listed on National Register of Historic Places, as of March 13, 1991.

References

Park buildings and structures on the National Register of Historic Places in Washington (state)
Buildings and structures in Lewis County, Washington
Buildings and structures in Mount Rainier National Park
Rustic architecture in Washington (state)
Restrooms in the United States
National Register of Historic Places in Mount Rainier National Park
1930s establishments in Washington (state)